The Agreement for the Suppression of the Circulation of Obscene Publications is a multilateral anti-pornography treaty that was initially negotiated and concluded in Paris in 1910. It was amended by a 1949 Protocol. As of 2013, the treaty has 57 state parties.

The treaty was concluded on 4 May 1910 in Paris and was initially entitled the Agreement for the Repression of Obscene Publications. The treaty was initially agreed to by a number of states, including France, Germany, Austria-Hungary, Russia, and Great Britain. Through the treaty, the states agreed to designate a government authority tasked with sharing with the other states information regarding obscenity offences "where the various acts constituting the offence have taken place in different countries". The treaty applied to "obscene writings, designs, pictures or objects". In 1923, states agreed to criminalise the creation, distribution, and trade of obscene works via the Convention for the Suppression of the Circulation of and Traffic in Obscene Publications.

In 1948, the United Nations General Assembly agreed to a Protocol which would amend the 1910 treaty. On 4 May 1949 at Lake Success, New York, the Protocol was signed by a number of states. Ultimately, the Protocol was ratified by 35 states, which caused the revised treaty to come into force on 1 March 1950. One of the changes made by the Protocol was the name of the treaty. As of 2013, the 1949 version of the treaty remains in force and has 57 state parties.

Signatures and ratifications of the 1910 treaty
The following states ratified the 1910 treaty:

Ratifications of the 1949 treaty

Further reading
 Perry, Stuart. The Indecent Publication Tribunal: A Social Experiment. With Text of the Legislation Since 1910 and Classifications of the Tribunal (Whicombe and Tombs, 1965).

External links
Ratifications of initial 1910 treaty.
Signatories and ratifications of the 1949 amending Protocol.
Ratifications of amended 1949 treaty.

Treaties concluded in 1910
Treaties entered into force in 1910
Treaties concluded in 1949
Treaties entered into force in 1950
United Nations treaties
Obscenity treaties
Treaties of Austria-Hungary
Treaties of Belgium
Treaties of the First Brazilian Republic
Treaties of Denmark
Treaties of the French Third Republic
Treaties of the German Empire
Treaties of the United Kingdom (1801–1922)
Treaties of the Kingdom of Italy (1861–1946)
Treaties of the Netherlands
Treaties of the Kingdom of Portugal
Treaties of the Russian Empire
Treaties of Spain under the Restoration
Treaties of Switzerland
Treaties of the Principality of Albania
Treaties of the Kingdom of Bulgaria
Treaties of the Republic of China (1912–1949)
Treaties of Czechoslovakia
Treaties of the Kingdom of Egypt
Treaties of Estonia
Treaties of Finland
Treaties of the Irish Free State
Treaties of Latvia
Treaties of Luxembourg
Treaties of Monaco
Treaties of Norway
Treaties of the Second Polish Republic
Treaties of the Kingdom of Romania
Treaties of San Marino
Treaties of Thailand
Treaties of Australia
Treaties of Austria
Treaties of Belarus
Treaties of Myanmar
Treaties of the Kingdom of Cambodia (1953–1970)
Treaties of Canada
Treaties of Cuba
Treaties of Cyprus
Treaties of the Czech Republic
Treaties of the Republic of the Congo (Léopoldville)
Treaties of Fiji
Treaties of the French Fourth Republic
Treaties of Ghana
Treaties of Haiti
Treaties of Iceland
Treaties of the Dominion of India
Treaties of Pahlavi Iran
Treaties of the Kingdom of Iraq
Treaties of Ireland
Treaties of Italy
Treaties of Jamaica
Treaties of Jordan
Treaties of Lesotho
Treaties of Liberia
Treaties of Madagascar
Treaties of Malawi
Treaties of the Federation of Malaya
Treaties of Malta
Treaties of Mauritius
Treaties of Mexico
Treaties of Montenegro
Treaties of New Zealand
Treaties of Nigeria
Treaties of the Dominion of Pakistan
Treaties of the Socialist Republic of Romania
Treaties of Serbia and Montenegro
Treaties of Sierra Leone
Treaties of Slovakia
Treaties of the Solomon Islands
Treaties of the Union of South Africa
Treaties of the Soviet Union
Treaties of the Dominion of Ceylon
Treaties of Tanganyika
Treaties of Trinidad and Tobago
Treaties of Turkey
Treaties of Yugoslavia
Treaties of Zambia
1910 in France
Treaties extended to the Faroe Islands
Treaties extended to Greenland
Treaties extended to the Colony of the Bahamas
Treaties extended to Basutoland
Treaties extended to the Colony of Barbados
Treaties extended to the Bechuanaland Protectorate
Treaties extended to the Belgian Congo
Treaties extended to Ruanda-Urundi
Treaties extended to Bermuda
Treaties extended to the East Africa Protectorate
Treaties extended to British Guiana
Treaties extended to British Honduras
Treaties extended to British Ceylon
Treaties extended to British Cyprus
Treaties extended to the Falkland Islands
Treaties extended to the Colony of Fiji
Treaties extended to the Gambia Colony and Protectorate
Treaties extended to Gibraltar
Treaties extended to the Gilbert and Ellice Islands
Treaties extended to the Gold Coast (British colony)
Treaties extended to British Hong Kong
Treaties extended to the Danish West Indies
Treaties extended to Iceland (dependent territory)
Treaties extended to Mandatory Iraq
Treaties extended to the Colony of Jamaica
Treaties extended to British Kenya
Treaties extended to the British Leeward Islands
Treaties extended to the British Windward Islands
Treaties extended to British Dominica
Treaties extended to the Federated Malay States
Treaties extended to the Unfederated Malay States
Treaties extended to the Crown Colony of Malta
Treaties extended to British Mauritius
Treaties extended to the Dutch East Indies
Treaties extended to Surinam (Dutch colony)
Treaties extended to Curaçao and Dependencies
Treaties extended to the Dominion of Newfoundland
Treaties extended to the Northern Nigeria Protectorate
Treaties extended to Northern Rhodesia
Treaties extended to Nyasaland
Treaties extended to Mandatory Palestine
Treaties extended to Saint Helena, Ascension and Tristan da Cunha
Treaties extended to the Crown Colony of Seychelles
Treaties extended to the British Solomon Islands
Treaties extended to the Colony of Sierra Leone
Treaties extended to British Somaliland
Treaties extended to Southern Rhodesia
Treaties extended to the Straits Settlements
Treaties extended to Tanganyika (territory)
Treaties extended to Swaziland (protectorate)
Treaties extended to the Emirate of Transjordan
Treaties extended to the Crown Colony of Trinidad and Tobago
Treaties extended to the Turks and Caicos Islands
Treaties extended to the Uganda Protectorate
Treaties extended to the British Virgin Islands
Treaties extended to Weihaiwei
Treaties extended to the Sultanate of Zanzibar
Treaties extended to the Southern Nigeria Protectorate
Treaties extended to German Samoa
Treaties extended to German South West Africa
Treaties extended to German East Africa
Treaties extended to German West Africa
Treaties extended to German New Guinea
Treaties extended to Australia
Treaties extended to Canada
Treaties extended to New Zealand
Treaties extended to the Union of South Africa
Treaties extended to the Pitcairn Islands
Treaties extended to the British Western Pacific Territories
Anti-pornography movements
Censorship of pornography